Ključ Castle may refer to:

Ključ Castle (Gacko), in Bosnia and Herzegovina
Ključ Castle (Ključ), in Bosnia and Herzegovina

See also